In 1996, Malawi received a number of Rwandan and Congolese refugees seeking asylum. The government did not turn away refugees, but it did invoke the principle of "first country of asylum." Under this principle, refugees who requested asylum in another country first, or who had the opportunity to do so would not subsequently be granted asylum in Malawi. There were no reports of the forcible repatriation of refugees.

See also 
 Foreign relations of Malawi
 Foreign relations of Rwanda

References

 
Rwanda
Bilateral relations of Rwanda
Rwanda
Malawi